The Association for the Study of the Cuban Economy (ASCE) is a professional association for the study of the Cuban economy. The association was incorporated on 3 August 1990 by Cuban American economists interested in the post-Cold War prospects for Cuba.

References

External links 
 ASCE website

Economy of Cuba
Professional associations based in the United States